A Euro container, also called Eurobox, Euro crate or KLT box (from , "small load carrier"), is an industrial stacking container conforming to the VDA 4500 standard. The standard was originally defined by the German Association of the Automotive Industry (VDA) for the automotive industry, but was subsequently adopted across many other areas of manufacturing and the shipping industry. The most common sizes (length × width) are 600 × 400 mm and 400 × 300 mm, which can be stacked together to fill a Euro-pallet measuring 1200 × 800 mm.

Dimensions 

These containers are manufactured typically in grey polypropylene or another thermoplast by injection molding.

Containers with full floor and walls are watertight. Many designs have at least two or more often four rectangular (about 12 x 4 cm) rounded grip-holes near the middle of the lips. The design may include some small holes in the lowest parts of at least two walls to let liquid run out if stored outdoors in rain or after washing. Walls constructed as grids allow one to see from the side into the box. If the bottom is formed by a grid, too, air may flow easily through even stacked boxes to keep bakery dry or allow quick cooling.

Euro-containers mounted on the rear rack of a bicycle or small motorcycle are widely used by newspaper-deliverers in Austrian towns. A Euro-container fits between the frame tubes in the low transportation bay of the Danish freight bike Bullitt.

Related standards
The 400×300-millimetre sizes and stacking height were adopted in the early 1990s for inter-stacking Systainer boxes.

See also 
 Cardboard box
 Banana box, a type of cardboard box designed for transportation of bananas
 EUR-pallet, the standard European pallet
 Gastronorm, a European standard for sizes on containers for kitchen use
 Milk crate, a similarly-sized standardized container
 Preferred metric sizes
 Reusable packaging
 Reverse logistics

References 

 
 

Shipping containers
Transport in Europe
Packaging